The Anglican Province of Enugu is one of the 14 ecclesiastical provinces of the Church of Nigeria. The province comprises 12 dioceses. The Archbishop of the Province of Enugu is Emmanuel Chukwuma, who succeeded Amos Madu in 2014. Madu was Archbishop since 2009.

The dioceses are:

Abakaliki (Bishop: Monday Nkwoagu)
Afikpo (Bishop: Paul Udogu)
Awgu/Aninri (Bishop: Benson Chukwunweike)
Eha-Amufu (Bishop: Daniel Olinya)
Enugu (Archbishop: Emmanuel Chukwuma)
Enugu North (Bishop: Sosthenes Ikechukwu Eze)
Ikwo (Bishop: Kenneth Ifemene)
Ngbo (Bishop: Godwin Awoke)
Nike (Bishop: Christian Onyia)
Nsukka (Bishop: Aloysius Agbo)
Oji River (Bishop: Amos Madu)
Udi (Bishop: Chjioke Aneke)

References

External links
Anglican Province of Enugu at Anglican Communion Official Website

Church of Nigeria ecclesiastical provinces